Jesse Atherton Bynum (May 23, 1797 – September 23, 1868) was a North Carolina landowner and politician.

He was the grandson of Colonel Jeptha Atherton, who served throughout the American Revolutionary War.

Political career

Bynum was a Congressional Representative from North Carolina; born in Halifax County, North Carolina, May 23, 1797; attended Princeton College in 1817 and 1818; studied law; was admitted to the bar and commenced practice in Halifax, North Carolina; member of the house of commons of North Carolina in 1822, 1823, and 1826–1829; elected as a Jacksonian to the Twenty-second and Twenty-third Congresses and as a Democrat to the two succeeding Congresses (March 4, 1833 – March 3, 1841).

Later life

Bynum moved to Alexandria, Louisiana, where he engaged in agricultural pursuits; died in Alexandria, La., September 23, 1868; interment in Rapides Cemetery, Pineville, Louisiana.

See also
Twenty-second United States Congress
Twenty-third United States Congress
Twenty-fourth United States Congress
Twenty-fifth United States Congress

References

U.S. Congress Biographical Directory entry

1797 births
1868 deaths
Democratic Party members of the North Carolina House of Representatives
Jacksonian members of the United States House of Representatives from North Carolina
19th-century American politicians
Democratic Party members of the United States House of Representatives from North Carolina